June James (married name June Morey, 22 April 1925 – 1 October 1997) was an Australian cricket player.

James played one women's test match for the Australia national women's cricket team in 1951. She was Western Australia's first female Test player.

References

1925 births
Australia women Test cricketers
1997 deaths